The Phenix City Story is a 1955 American film noir crime film directed by Phil Karlson for Allied Artists, written by Daniel Mainwaring and Crane Wilbur and starring John McIntire, Richard Kiley, and Kathryn Grant. It had an unusual "triple premiere" held on July 19, 1955 in Phenix City, Alabama, Columbus, Georgia, and Chicago, Illinois (the AFI incorrectly lists the date as July 9).

Plot
In a corrupt Alabama town near the Army's Fort Benning, the law can do little to stop the criminal activities of Rhett Tanner, particularly in the wide-open "red-light district" area known for prostitution, taverns, and crooked gambling. Most of the police do not even try, since they are on Tanner's payroll.

Local attorney Albert "Pat" Patterson, initially neutral and complacent, is urged to run for State Attorney General and clean up Phenix City, but he wants no part of a thankless, impossible job. He is content to welcome home his son John from military service. However, soon violence breaks out trying to silence the reform-minded citizens committee. John gets caught in the middle when Clem Wilson, a thug who works for Tanner, and others assault innocent citizens.

Patterson finally agrees to get involved in reforming the town, but as soon as he wins the Democratic nomination for state attorney general, he is killed. It is up to John to avenge his father, but his own family ends up at risk.

Cast

Production

The film depicts the real-life 1954 assassination of Albert Patterson, who had just been nominated as the Democratic candidate for Alabama Attorney General on a platform of cleaning up Phenix City, a city controlled by organized crime. Patterson was murdered in Phenix City, and the subsequent outcry resulted in the imposition of martial law by the state government. Some prints of the film include a 13-minute newsreel-style preface including newsman Clete Roberts interviewing many of the actual participants.

Reception

Critical response
When the film was released in 1955, Bosley Crowther, film critic for The New York Times, gave it a positive review, writing, "In a style of dramatic documentation that is as sharp and sure as was that of On the Waterfront--or, for a more appropriate comparison, that of the memorable All the King's Men--scriptwriters Crane Wilbur and Dan Mainwaring and director Phil Karlson expose the raw tissue of corruption and terrorism in an American city that is steeped in vice. They catch in slashing, searching glimpses the shrewd chicanery of evil men, the callousness and baseness of their puppets and the dread and silence of local citizens. And, through a series of excellent performances, topped by that of John McIntyre as the eventually martyred crusader, they show the sinew and the bone of those who strive for decent things."

Film critic Bruce Eder wrote, "One of the most violent and realistic crime films of the 1950s, The Phenix City Story pulses with the bracing energy of actual life captured on the screen in its establishing shots and key scenes, and punctuates that background with explosively filmed action scenes. Director Phil Karlson showed just how good he was at merging well-told screen drama with vivid verisimilitude and leaving no seams to show where they joined. Filmed on location in Alabama with a documentary-like look, the movie captured the ambiance and tenor of its Deep South setting better than almost any other fact-based movie of its era."

Accuracy
Ray Jenkins, one of the two reporters who covered the Phenix City story for the Columbus Ledger, whose coverage won the 1955 Pulitzer Prize for Meritorious Public Service, has contended that the film departed significantly from reality. Jenkins writes, "For starters, the film was a rush job intended to capture public interest while the story was still unfolding. As a result, the film leaves the impression that the local mafia that ran the vice industry in Phenix City killed Albert Patterson. Subsequent indictments and trials demonstrated beyond doubt that the assassination was politically motivated. Also, the film depicts an inflammatory scene in which the mob kills a young black girl and tosses the body onto the lawn of the Patterson home as a warning. Nothing remotely like this episode actually happened."

Legacy
In 2019, the film was selected by the Library of Congress for preservation in the National Film Registry for being "culturally, historically, or aesthetically significant".

In other media 
It was also featured in the 1995 documentary film A Personal Journey with Martin Scorsese Through American Movies.

DVD release
Warner Bros. released the film on DVD on July 13, 2010, in its Film Noir Classic Collection, Vol. 5.

See also
 List of American films of 1955
 Culture of Alabama
 Culture of Georgia

References

External links
 
 
 
 
  (John Patterson's speech)
 Scorsese Curates: The Phenix City Story on The Daily Beast

1955 films
1950s crime thriller films
American black-and-white films
American crime thriller films
Crime films based on actual events
1950s English-language films
Film noir
Films about elections
Films directed by Phil Karlson
Films produced by Samuel Bischoff
Films scored by Harry Sukman
Films set in Alabama
Films set in 1954
Russell County, Alabama
United States National Film Registry films
1950s American films
Films set in the 1950s
Films about racism